Vernate may refer to:

Vernate, Lombardy, in Italy
Vernate, Ticino, in Switzerland

See also
Vernati, an Italian surname